Tone scale may refer to:

 Musical scales, including the Whole tone scale
 Color scales
 Emotional tone scale, a Scientology concept